Damitha Silva (born 26 August 1998) is a Sri Lankan cricketer. He made his first-class debut for Kurunegala Youth Cricket Club in Tier B of the 2016–17 Premier League Tournament on 16 December 2016. Prior to his debut, he was named in Sri Lanka's squad for the 2016 Under-19 Cricket World Cup. He made his Twenty20 debut for Tamil Union Cricket and Athletic Club in the 2018–19 SLC Twenty20 Tournament on 15 February 2019. He made his List A debut for Tamil Union Cricket and Athletic Club in the 2018–19 Premier Limited Overs Tournament on 5 March 2019.

References

External links
 

1998 births
Living people
Sri Lankan cricketers
Kurunegala Youth Cricket Club cricketers
Lankan Cricket Club cricketers
Tamil Union Cricket and Athletic Club cricketers
Sportspeople from Kurunegala